The 1951–52 Western Kentucky State Hilltoppers men's basketball team represented Western Kentucky State College (now known as Western Kentucky University) during the 1951-52 NCAA University Division Basketball season. The Hilltoppers were led by future Naismith Memorial Basketball Hall of Fame coach Edgar Diddle and leading scorer, forward Tom Marshall.  The Hilltoppers won the Ohio Valley Conference season and tournament championships, and were invited to the 1952 National Invitation Tournament.  During this period, the NIT was considered on par with the NCAA tournament.
Marshall, Art Spoelstra, Gene Rhodes, and Richard White were named to the All-Conference and OVC Tournament teams.

Schedule

|-
!colspan=6| Regular Season

|-

 

 

|-
!colspan=6| 1952 Ohio Valley Conference Tournament

|-
!colspan=6| Regular Season

|-
!colspan=6| 1952 National Invitation Tournament

References

Western Kentucky Hilltoppers basketball seasons
Western Kentucky State
Western Kentucky State
Western Kentucky State Basketball, Men's
Western Kentucky State Basketball, Men's